Sexpionage is the involvement of sexual activity, or the possibility of sexual activity, intimacy, romance, or seduction to conduct espionage.  Sex or the possibility of sex can function as a distraction, incentive, cover story, or unintended part of any intelligence operation. 

Female agents who use such tactics are known as swallows, while male ones are known as ravens. A commonly known type of sexpionage is a honey trap operation, which is designed to compromise an opponent sexually to elicit information from that person. 

Sexpionage is a historically documented phenomenon, though a book review published by a CIA publication in 2008 noted that the three English-language books about it suffered from errors of fact and lack of documentation.

Homosexual entrapment with the NSA 
Discrimination and cultural attitudes toward homosexuals have pressured them into spying or not spying for a certain entity, sometimes with drastic consequences.  For example, Admiral Bobby Ray Inman, former director of the NSA, decided to not fire openly gay employees in exchange for each employee's written promise not to give in to blackmail and that each gay employee would inform his family, eliminating any further potential for blackmail.  This was a serious issue, as two NSA analysts defected to Moscow in 1960 following a purge of homosexuals from the agency.

Soviet and Russian examples 
Yakov Agranov, deputy of the NKVD,  known as one of main organizers of Soviet political repressions and Stalinist show trials in 1920s and 1930s, was responsible for sex spy operations among creative-class intelligentsia.  He used Bolshoi ballerinas, as well as cinema and theater actresses. Agranov created a school named  the Lenin Technical School (Ленинская техническая школа).  The school was opened in 1931 by Vyacheslav Menzhinsky, who was the head of the Joint State Political Directorate. According to legend, Richard Sorge and Nikolai Kuznetsov studied at a Moscow Sexpionage school.

Kazan Tatarstan Sexpionage School
According to former CIA officer Jason Matthews, the Soviet Union had a sexpionage school called "State School 4" in Kazan, Tatarstan, southeast of Moscow, on the banks of the Volga river.  The school trained female agents to be "swallows". This school was depicted in Matthews' 2013 novel Red Sparrow. In 2018, a film of the same name was adapted from it.

Matthews believes the Kazan school has been closed, but that Russia now uses independent contractors as honey traps.  Matthew has said, "If a human target with access to classified information went to Moscow [today], he’d probably see a modern-day Swallow at one of the bars of the five-star hotels in Moscow."

Specific examples 
In a 2015 lecture, former CIA officer Jonna Mendez explained how Czechoslovakia husband and wife KGB spies Karl Koecher and Hana Koecher used sex to infiltrate the CIA and gather top-secret information. One popular Washington, D.C., "swinger’s club" frequented by the couple counted at least 10 CIA staffers and a United States senator as members. 

In 2018, Mendez told the New York Times that an American Marine stationed at the American embassy in Moscow was seduced by a swallow, and subsequently allowed Russian agents onto the property. Mendez said China and other countries also had such programs.

In 1963, the playwright and screenwriter Yuri Krotkov defected to the West.  He revealed that he had been told by the KGB to seek out attractive young women who could be used to seduce men.  He would recruit actresses while doing film work, promising better film roles, money and clothes.

Trapped targets during the Soviet Union period included: 
 Sukarno, President of Indonesia; 
 , French ambassador in the 1950s; 
 Clayton J. Lonetree, a Marine guarding the US embassy; 
 Roy Guindon, a Canadian diplomat; 
 Col. Louis Guibaud, a French military attache who committed suicide; 
 Jeremy Wolfenden, a homosexual British journalist in Moscow in the early 1960s;
 John Watkins, homosexual Canadian ambassador in Moscow in 1954;
 Geoffrey Harrison, British ambassador;
 U.S. Army Major James R. Holbrook;
 John Vassall, a homosexual British navy clerk;
 British MP Anthony Courtney;

The Washington Post reported in 1987 that "most westerners who have spent any length of time in Moscow have their favorite tale of an attempted seduction by a KGB swallow or raven."

East German spies
Spies for East Germany were called "Romeos" created by Markus Wolf, the former head of East Germany's foreign intelligence service the Stasi.  Around 40 women were prosecuted for espionage in the Federal Republic of Germany.

Notable people and events

Kursk Nightingale – Russia 
Nadezhda Plevitskaya, a former opera singer known as the "Kursk Nightingale" before the Russian Civil War, found herself living without her former luxuries following the Bolshevik Revolution.  The Cheka recruited Plevitskaya through her lust for money.  "Traveling throughout the white-held areas, she entertained the troops at free concerts, at the same time ingratiating herself with anti-Bolshevik leaders who had long admired the 'Kursk Nightingale.' In the process, she began to collect interesting intelligence tidbits from some of the more indiscreet Whites (including those she slept with to pry even more information)."  However, Plevitskaya was captured by the Whites after intercepting some of her messages to the Cheka and ordered to be executed by firing squad.  Nikolai Skoblin, then a young White cavalry officer and a megalomaniac obsessed with the idea of recreating the "Holy Russia", a mythical land that existed before the time of the Tsars, saw Plevitskaya refuse a blindfold before her execution.  Motivated by her beauty and courage, Skoblin rode up, ordered the firing squad not to fire, and released her in his custody.  Then the Cheka used Plevitskaya to recruit Skoblin, and both got married (with Nadezhda's then-husband understandingly serving as best man in the wedding) and moved to Paris, working for the Cheka among the Russian Exile Movement.

Cynthia – Britain 
Amy Thorpe Pack was an American who married a senior British diplomat and began extramarital affairs upon finding her marriage passionless.  She volunteered her services to MI6 while living with her husband in Warsaw in 1937.  In Warsaw, she seduced a Polish Foreign Ministry Official eliciting from him Poland's plans regarding how to deal with Hitler and Stalin.  Following this, she learned from another Polish official that some Polish mathematicians had started cracking the German Enigma Ciphers. Later, in Czechoslovakia, she discovered the German plans to invade Czechoslovakia.  After a colorless stint of boredom at a posting in Santiago, Chile, Pack separated from her husband and went to New York City in 1941, when William Stephenson, then an MI6 chief of station, contacted her and asked her to infiltrate embassies in Washington, D.C.  Realizing her motivation was a lust for danger and excitement, Stephenson gave her the code name Cynthia, after a long-lost love.  Pack then seduced the chief of station for Italian military intelligence and acquired the Italian navy cipher. Beginning in early 1942, Pack posed as a pro-Vichy journalist and got Charles Brousse, the Vichy French embassy's press attaché and a Vichy politician, to fall in love with her and agree to work as an OSS asset.  In a near six-hour night burglary operation, Pack and Brousse let an OSS safecracker into the embassy to carry away the Vichy code books for photographing, and at one point Pack undressed to cover for the operation by deceiving a suspicious night guard.  After the operation for the Vichy codes, Pack retired from espionage because she fell in love with Brousse.

Commander Courtney Affair – Soviet Union 
Commander Anthony Courtney was a "tough and opinionated former naval officer and Member of Parliament who denounced the government of the day and the Foreign Office for softness in permitting Soviet and Iron Curtain diplomats to abuse their privileges for espionage purposes."  The Commander spoke fluent Russian and in 1961 he went to bed with his Intourist guide, Zinaida Grigorievna Volkova, who was in fact a regular KGB seductress, and KGB photographers captured it.  The KGB tried to blackmail Courtney into ending his Parliamentary tirades, though he refused, and they circulated the pictures to other members of parliament and business associates.  Furthermore, Private Eye, a London satirical journal, obtained the photos and published them.  Courtney lost his seat in the following election.

Ambassador Dejean Affair – Soviet Union 
, the former French ambassador to the Soviet Union, was an old friend with close connections to President De Gaulle, and he had a fondness for women. The KGB took advantage of this and set up Dejean first with Lydia Khovanskaya, a divorcee who spoke French, and later Larisa Kronberg-Sobolevskaya, an actress.  While Dejean was with Larisa, her pretend husband returned home, as staged, from a geological expedition in Siberia, and beat Dejean, but allowed him to leave upon Larisa's pleading. Dejean went to a Soviet friend, who unbeknownst to him worked for the KGB, to quiet the affair. The Soviets took no immediate action, but preferred to hold their operation as leverage just in case to keep the French ambassador within their sway. Similar KGB honey traps on Dejean's wife, Marie-Claire, were unsuccessful. President De Gaulle and the French found out about the affair from British intelligence, who in turn learned of it from Yuri Krotkov, a defector. Krotkov defected in 1963 after a French Air Force attaché, Colonel Louis Guibard, shot himself when the KGB showed him pictures they took of his affair with a Russian woman and presented him with the choice of either exposure or collaboration.

Sir Geoffrey and Galya – Soviet Union 
Sir Geoffrey Harrison, British Ambassador to Moscow, was the target of a KGB blackmail attempt in 1968, when they placed an attractive maid named Galya in the diplomatic mission. Sir Geoffrey fell for the honey trap, and Galya told him that pictures had been taken and that he would be exposed unless he provided information to the KGB.  The scandal broke, but Sir Geoffrey had no action taken against him and he retired on full pension.

KGB break-in at Swedish Embassy in Moscow – Soviet Union 
Yuri Nosenko, a Soviet defector to the West, detailed the use of a honey trap when the KGB launched a night operation to raid the Swedish Embassy in Moscow with a twelve-strong crew of safe-pickers and break-in experts.  According to Nosenko, a female KGB seductress lured away the embassy's night watchman and another agent distracted a guard dog by feeding it meat.

Donald Maclean – Soviet Union 
Donald Duart Maclean was a British diplomat who spied for the Soviet Union mostly out of love for it, and he never received pay, although did get a KGB pension. However, to make sure that Maclean would not so easily double-cross the Soviets, they had Guy Burgess, another British homosexual spying for the Soviets, take photos of Maclean in bed with another man during an orgy.

William Vassall – Soviet Union 
William John Vassall was an openly gay man who boasted that men said he had "come to bed eyes", and in 1954, as a clerk in the office of the British naval attaché, Vassall went to Moscow. A Polish clerk from the embassy brought Vassall to a party with much alcohol, and he became involved in homosexual activity. Soon, Vassall had been blackmailed and was stealing classified information for the Soviets.

American use
Former Assistant FBI Director William C. Sullivan in testimony before the Church Committee on 1 November 1975 stated: "The use of sex is a common practice among intelligence services all over the world. This is a tough dirty business. We have used that technique against the Soviets. They have used it against us."

Aleksandr Ogorodnik, Russian Ministry of Foreign Affairs' planning department was codenamed TRIGON by the Central Intelligence Agency dated a Spanish woman who was recruited by the CIA. In 1973, she persuaded him to supply the CIA with information.

Chinese use
Beginning with his time as a Dublin, California, city councilor, Eric Swalwell was targeted by a Chinese woman believed to be a clandestine officer of China's Ministry of State Security. The FBI gave Swalwell a "defensive briefing" in 2015, informing him that Christine Fang was a suspected Chinese agent. She also engaged with two midwestern city mayors in relationships which were of either a sexual or romantic nature. In the media, Swalwell's general relationship with Fang has been characterized as problematic, particularly given the high-profile role that he occupied – a member of the House Intelligence Committee – within the intelligence community.

Spies mistaken as ravens 
A male spy with a promiscuous lifestyle is not necessarily a professional raven. For example, Duško Popov was a double agent working for MI5 and feeding information to the Abwehr in World War II. He came from a moderately wealthy Yugoslavian family, and had a taste for expensive restaurants, women, and nightclubs. MI5 code-named him TRICYCLE because he was the head of a group of three double-agents. Despite being seen as an inspiration for James Bond, he was not a raven, but instead used supposed commercial connections to feed faked intelligence to the Nazis.

Agent falling for their mission partner 
An instance of sex or intimacy which can happen during espionage is when an agent falls for his or her partner. In one example, an Israeli "champagne spy", Wolfgang Lotz, who pretended to be a former Afrika Corps vet, covered himself deep in German social circles in Egypt prior to the Six-Day War, and fell in love with his fake "German" wife, who converted to Judaism.  Lotz divorced his real wife, who was Israeli, for his partner.

In popular culture 
Most variations of the Black Widow in Marvel Comics are fictional characters depicted as swallows, deliberately based on the Russian program.

James Bond is a fictional character depicted as a raven; his parodical counterpart Austin Powers also uses sexpionage to elicit information.

A 1987 espionage-themed American pornographic film featuring Dana Dylan, Rachel Ashley, and Britt Morgan was titled "Sexpionage".

In the 2014 film The Interview, use of a swallow is somewhat colloquially referred to as "honeypotting", and use of a raven is referred to as "honeydicking".

The 2018 film Red Sparrow shows a modern version of sexpionage.

The 2021 Indian action espionage thriller streaming television series Special Ops 1.5: The Himmat Story shows honey trapping by trained and contract based swallows.

See also
 Recruitment of spies § Love, honeypots, and recruitment
 LOVEINT
 History of espionage

References

Further reading

 Sex and Soviet espionage (2002) Inna Svechenovskaya. Olma-Press
 The A to Z of Sexpionage

Espionage techniques
Counterintelligence
Types of espionage
Sexuality